Apobaterion (Greek ἀποβατήριον) may refer to:
a farewell speech
offerings made to the gods upon a safe landing
a "place of landing", used of the landing of Noah's Ark, see Mount Judi